Between 1&2 (stylized as BETW9EN 1&2) is the eleventh extended play (EP) by South Korean girl group Twice. It was released on August 26, 2022, by JYP Entertainment and Republic Records and consists of seven tracks, including the lead single "Talk That Talk".

Background 
Between 1&2 followed Celebrate, Twice's fourth Japanese studio album, and served as the group's first Korean release in 2022. On May 16, after concluding their second worldwide concert tour in Los Angeles, a cryptic post featuring the dates "2022.06.24" and "2022.08.26" circulated Twice's social media accounts, leading to fan speculation. June 24 was later revealed as the release date for Nayeon's solo debut EP, Im Nayeon.

On July 2, while hosting an episode of MBC's Show! Music Core, Twice member Dahyun announced that Twice would be making a comeback, stating that "it is planned, so please look forward to it". On July 12, all members of Twice renewed their contracts with JYP Entertainment. One day later, the label announced a "mini album" titled Between 1&2 with a planned release date of August 26.

Composition 
Members Chaeyoung, Dahyun, and Jihyo wrote lyrics of some songs on Between 1&2, with the latter also being credited as a composer on the song "Trouble". The EP's second track, "Queen of Hearts", an English song, features a drum beat and guitar sound mixed with Twice's "cool" vocals in harmony. "Brave" was described as a dance-pop track centered on the group's fandom, called Once, which "gives Twice the courage to become themselves". Lyrically, the song expresses "the sincerity of Twice members".

Title 
Similar to Formula of Love: O+T<3, the EP's title, Between 1&2, represents the connection of Twice with their fandom, Once.

Release and promotion 
A promotional poster with the phrase "Tell Me What You Want" written above a light switch was posted onto Twice's social media accounts on July 13, 2022. On July 26, the tracklist of Between 1&2 was released. On August 5, JYP Entertainment released a timetable for the EP. On August 9, Twice released an opening trailer for the EP and a snippet of lead single "Talk That Talk".
On August 17 and 18, individual teasers and group photos demonstrating the concept of the album were posted on Twice's official social media accounts. On August 19, the group released snippets of the second track, "Queen of Hearts", and fifth track, "Brave". On August 23, the group released a sneak peek to the album. On August 24 and 25, the group released two teasers for the music video of "Talk That Talk".

Critical reception 

Writing for NME, Tanu I. Raj noted that while Between 1&2 looks back on Twice's "growth with fondness and pride, and leave[s] us with the promise of better things to come", it suffers to some "road bumps".

Commercial performance 
In South Korea the mini album took third place, with over 519,000 units sold, on the Hanteo Monthly Chart, setting a new personal record for the group. This broke the group's previous sales for More & More on the chart. It debuted at number 2 on South Korea's Circle Album Chart with 995,614 units sold in two pre-sale days. In Japan, it debuted at number 4 on Oricon's Digital Albums Chart and at number 10 on Billboard Japans Hot Albums chart. On the US Billboard 200, the EP peaked at number 3, selling over 100,000 equivalent album units. Of these, 94,000 were pure sales, 6,000 were streaming-equivalent units, and a negligible amount were track-equivalent units. It is their fifth and best selling album on the chart after Formula of Love: O+T=<3.

Track listing

Personnel 
Credits adapted from Melon.

Musicians
 Twice – vocals 
 Jihyo – lyricist , composing , producer , vocal director , background vocals  
 Chaeyoung – lyricist 
 Dahyun – lyricist 
 danke (lalala studio) – lyricist 
 Woomin Lee 'collapsedone' – lyricist , composition , arrangement , synth , bass , guitar 
 March (MRCH) – composition , arrangement , background vocals 
 Greg Bonnick – lyricist , composition 
 Hayden Chapman – lyricist , composition 
 Paulina Cerrilla – lyricist , composition 
 Kyler Niko – lyricist , composition 
 LDN Noise – arrangement 
 Sophia Pae – background vocals , composition 
 Barry Cohen – composition 
 Kelsey Klingensmith – composition 
 Musikality – composition 
 Gray Trainer – composition , arrangement , guitar 
 Gingerbread – arrangement 
 earattack – composition , arrangement , synthesizer , piano , drum 
 chAN's – composition , arrangement , synthesizer , piano , drum 
 Darm – composition , arrangement , synthesizer , piano , drum 
 Justin Reinstein – composition 
 JJean – composition 
 Slow Rabbit – lyricist , composition , synthesizer  arrangement 
 Isran – lyricist 
 Jo Yoon-kyung – lyricist 
 Noh Joo-hwan – lyricist 
 Melanie Fontana – composition 
 Lindgren – composition 
 Louise Frick Sveen – composition 
 Maria Marcus – composition 
 OLLIPOP – composition 
 Jonna Hall – composition 
 Kyler Niko – composition 
 Paulina Cerrilla – composition 
 YOUNG – Guitar 
 Natalie Dunn – composition 
 Ella McMahon – composition 
 Shakka Philip – composition 
 Yannick Rastogi – composition , synths , bass , drums 
 Zacharie Raymond – composition , synths , bass , drums 
 Banx & Ranx – arrangement 
 Christian Fast – composition , arrangement 
 Johannes Willinder – composition , arrangement 
 Malin Johansson – composition , arrangement 

Technical
 Woomin Lee 'collapsedone' – programming  , vocals directing 
 March (MRCH) – programming 
 Sehee Eom – recording 
 Sangyeop Lee – recording 
 Hyejin Goo – recording 
 Tony Maserati – mixing 
 David K – mixing 
 Younghyun – mixing 
 Namwoo Kwon –  mastering 
 Sophia Pae – vocal director 
 Jiyoung Shin – additional editor , vocal director 
 Tae-seop Lee – mixing 
 Gingerbread – programming , percussion 
 Kyungwon Lee – digital editing  
 Hongjin Lim – mixing 
 earattack – programming , vocal director 
 chAN's – programming 
 Darm – programming 
 Slow Rabbit – keyboard , vocal director , digital editing 
 YANG GA – mixing 
 Yannick Rastogi – programming , recording 
 Zacharie Raymond – programming , recording 
 Johannes Willinder – programming , keyboards

Charts

Weekly charts

Monthly charts

Year-end charts

Certifications

See also
 List of certified albums in South Korea

Notes

References 

2022 EPs
Korean-language EPs
Twice (group) EPs
Republic Records EPs
JYP Entertainment EPs